Orlovka is a rural locality (a selo) and the administrative centre of Orlovsky Selsoviet, Yanaulsky District, Bashkortostan, Russia. The population was 374 as of 2010. There are 3 streets.

Geography 
Orlovka is located 26 km southeast of Yanaul (the district's administrative centre) by road. Yamyady is the nearest rural locality.

References 

Rural localities in Yanaulsky District